The Women's sabre competition at the 2022 World Fencing Championships was held on 20 July 2022. The qualification was held on 17 July.

Draw

Finals

Top half

Section 1

Section 2

Bottom half

Section 3

Section 4

References

External links
Bracket

Women's sabre
2022 in women's fencing